The 1969 Wills International was a joint men's and women's tennis tournament  played on outdoor grass courts in Auckland, New Zealand from 31 January until 4 February 1968. Barry Phillips-Moore and Kerry Melville won the singles titles.

Finals

Men's singles
 Barry Phillips-Moore defeated  Onny Parun 6–3, 6–8, 1–6, 6–3, 6–2

Women's singles
 Kerry Melville defeated  Gail Sherriff 8–6, 6–1

Men's doubles
 Dick Crealy /  Barry Phillips-Moore defeated  Mike Belkin /  Juan Gisbert Sr. 6–3, 6–4

Women's doubles
 Kerry Melville /  Gail Sherriff defeated  Astrid Suurbeek /  Ada Bakker 6–0, 6–2

Mixed doubles
 Gail Sherriff /  Juan Gisbert Sr. defeated  Kerry Melville /  Dick Crealy 7–5, 13–11

References

External links 
 ATP – tournament profile

ATP Auckland Open
New Zealand Open
January 1968 sports events in New Zealand